Mount Wilson is a mountain in the Green Mountains in the U.S. state of Vermont. Located in the Breadloaf Wilderness of the Green Mountain National Forest, its summit is in the town of Ripton in Addison County. The mountain is named after Woodrow Wilson, former president of the United States. Flanked by Bread Loaf Mountain to the southwest, Mount Wilson is one of five peaks in Vermont's Presidential Range. At , it is the 12th highest peak in Vermont and one of the hundred highest peaks in New England.

Drainage basin

Mount Wilson stands within the watersheds of Lake Champlain and the Connecticut River. The southeast side of Mount Wilson drains into the headwaters of the White River, thence into the Connecticut River, which drains into Long Island Sound in Connecticut. The northeast side of Mount Wilson drains into the Clark Brook and thence into the White River. The northwest side of Mount Wilson drains into the headwaters of the New Haven River, thence into Otter Creek, Lake Champlain, Canada's Richelieu River, the Saint Lawrence River, and ultimately into the Gulf of Saint Lawrence.

Hiking

The Long Trail traverses the summit of Mount Wilson. Multiple side trails provide access to this section of the Long Trail. The Clark Brook Trail, whose trailhead is in the town of Granville, intersects the Long Trail after . The Emily Proctor Trail, whose trailhead is in the town of Lincoln, terminates at the Emily Proctor Shelter after .

A popular loop hike begins and ends at the Emily Proctor Trailhead (or the Cooley Glen Trailhead in a clockwise direction). The  loop hike takes in three peaks of the Presidential Range: Mount Wilson, Mount Roosevelt, and Mount Cleveland.

See also 

 List of mountains in Vermont
 List of New England Hundred Highest

References

Mountains of Vermont
New England Hundred Highest
Ripton, Vermont
Mountains of Addison County, Vermont